James Goudie may refer to:
 James B. Goudie Jr. (1769–1836), Indiana politician
 James Goudie (draughtsman), Scottish-born designer of the SS Royal William amongst others